Michael George Ansara (April 15, 1922 – July 31, 2013) was an American actor. He portrayed Cochise in the television series Broken Arrow, Kane in the 1979–1981 series Buck Rogers in the 25th Century, Commander Kang in Star Trek: The Original Series, Deputy U.S. Marshal Sam Buckhart in the NBC series Law of the Plainsman, and provided the voice for Mr. Freeze in Batman: The Animated Series and several of its spin-offs. Ansara received a star on the Hollywood Walk of Fame for his work in the television industry, located at 6666 Hollywood Boulevard.

Early life
Michael George Ansara was born in a small village in the Mandate for Syria and the Lebanon, and his family immigrated to the United States when he was two years old. He was of Lebanese descent. They lived in Lowell, Massachusetts, for a decade before moving to California. He originally wanted to be a physician, but developed a passion for becoming a performer after he began taking acting classes at Pasadena Playhouse to overcome his shyness. He was educated at Los Angeles City College, from which Ansara earned an Associate of Arts degree. Ansara served as a medic in the army during World War II.

Career

Early work
During the 1950s, Ansara appeared in several episodes of Alfred Hitchcock Presents. He appeared in a 1951 episode of The Lone Ranger titled "Trouble at Black Rock." In 1953, he appeared as Pindarus in Joseph Mankiewicz' big screen adaptation of Julius Caesar, with Marlon Brando, James Mason and John Gielgud. However, the popular television series Broken Arrow (1956), wherein he played the lead role of Cochise, raised Ansara's profile and made him a household name. While making the series, the 20th Century-Fox publicity department arranged a date between Ansara and actress Barbara Eden.

The two later married and Ansara guest-starred on Eden's sitcom I Dream of Jeannie as the Blue Djinn. He also played King Kamehameha in the Jeannie episode "The Battle of Waikīkī", and in the final season, he played Major Biff Jellico in the episode "My Sister, the Home Wrecker". Ansara and Eden divorced in 1974. The couple had one son together, actor Matthew Ansara, who died on June 25, 2001, of a heroin overdose.

Ansara starred in his own ABC-TV series, Law of the Plainsman (1959–1960), with Gina Gillespie and Robert Harland. He performed as an Apache Indian named Sam Buckhart, who had been appointed as a U.S. Marshal. The series began as an episode of The Rifleman.

Ansara also played in Biblical epics: The Robe (1953) as Judas Iscariot, The Ten Commandments (1956) as a taskmaster (uncredited), and The Greatest Story Ever Told (1965) as Herod's commander. He also appeared as Belshazzar in Columbia's 1953 movie Slaves of Babylon.

Later career
In 1961, Ansara played the role of Miguel Alvarez in the film Voyage to the Bottom of the Sea, co-starring with Barbara Eden and Walter Pidgeon, who played the role of Admiral Harriman Nelson. Ansara later appeared in an episode of the television series Voyage to the Bottom of the Sea, playing the rebel sub commander Captain Ruiz in "Killers of the Deep" (1966). He also appeared in the episode "Hot Line" (broadcast on November 9, 1964) as a Soviet scientist who disarms a defective Soviet atomic satellite that has crashed off the coast of California and he appeared as Carl in the episode "Night Visitors" of the NBC anthology series The Barbara Stanwyck Show.In 1962, he starred in a Broadway show with the silent film actor Ramon Novarro.

In 1964, he made his only guest appearance on Perry Mason as Vince Kabat in "The Case of the Antic Angel." Also that year, he played the lead character of "Qarlo," the Soldier in an episode of The Outer Limits. It opened the second season of shows on 19 September 1964 and was written by acclaimed fantasy writer and novelist Harlan Ellison, adapting it from his short story "Soldier from Tomorrow."

He starred in a supporting role in the 1965 Elvis Presley film, Harum Scarum. His wife, Barbara Eden, had starred in an earlier Elvis film, 1960's Flaming Star.

Ansara played the Ruler on episode 22, "The Challenge," of the television series Lost in Space (March 2, 1966) with a young Kurt Russell as his son Quano. Later that same year, Ansara appeared in the feature film Texas Across the River with Dean Martin. He also appeared on Daniel Boone as Red Sky in a 1966 episode. In another 1966 episode of that series, Ansara portrayed Sebastian Drake.  He played two different characters in two episodes of the 1966 science fiction television series The Time Tunnel, Colonel Hruda in episode #11 and the Curator in episode #28 .

Ansara continued appearing in guest starring roles on television, including "The Savage Street", a 1967 episode of the ABC action drama series The Fugitive, "On a Clear Night You Can See Earth", a 1969 episode of the ABC-TV series Land of the Giants, and "The Western", the penultimate episode of the original CBS television series Mission: Impossible, which aired in 1973.

In 1976, Ansara starred in the movie Mohammad, Messenger of God (also titled The Message), about the origin of Islam and the message of the Islamic prophet Muhammad.

In 1978, he starred in the acclaimed miniseries Centennial, based on the novel by James A. Michener. Ansara played the Indian leader Lame Beaver, whose descendants are showcased throughout the centuries alongside the growth of the West and the town that the novel and miniseries are named after.

Ansara played the recurring role of Killer Kane in the 1979–1980 season of Buck Rogers in the 25th Century.

He narrated Paul Goble's "The Gift of the Sacred Dog" at Crow Agency, Montana, on June 17, 1983, and Sheila MacGill-Callahan's "And Still the Turtle Watched" on October 21, 1993, on the PBS series Reading Rainbow.

In 1988, Ansara appeared in an episode of the television series Murder, She Wrote titled "The Last Flight of the Dixie Damsel".

In 1992, he voiced Mr. Freeze in the Batman: The Animated Series episode "Heart of Ice", and won critical acclaim for his performance as the iconic villain. He went on to voice Mr. Freeze in the animated film Batman & Mr. Freeze: SubZero, an episode of both The New Batman Adventures and Batman Beyond, and the video game Batman: Vengeance.

In 1994, Ansara portrayed the Technomage Elric in the Babylon 5 episode "The Geometry of Shadows".

Star Trek
He is one of nine actors to play the same character (in his case the Klingon commander Kang) on three Star Trek television series – the original series ("Day of the Dove"), Deep Space Nine ("Blood Oath") and Voyager ("Flashback").

Awards and honors
Ansara was nominated for a Saturn Award, and has won a Western Heritage Award for Rawhide.

On February 8, 1960, Ansara received a star on the Hollywood Walk of Fame for his work in the television industry, located at 6666 Hollywood Boulevard.

Personal life and death

Ansara was married three times, first to actress Jean Byron in 1955; the couple divorced in 1956. In 1958, Ansara married Barbara Eden, who co-starred with him in Irwin Allen's Voyage to the Bottom of the Sea. The couple had a son, Matthew Ansara. Ansara and Eden divorced in 1974, and he married actress Beverly Kushida in 1977. On June 25, 2001, his son Matthew died from a drug overdose in Monrovia, California. Ansara was a Greek Orthodox Christian.

Ansara died from complications of Alzheimer's disease at his home in Calabasas on July 31, 2013, at the age of 91. His interment is at Forest Lawn Memorial Park in the Hollywood Hills of Los Angeles, next to his son Matthew.

Filmography

Film

Television

Video Games

Videos

Other credits

References

External links

 
 
 
 

1922 births
2013 deaths
20th-century American male actors
American people of Lebanese descent
Lebanese American
American male film actors
American male stage actors
American male television actors
Combat medics
Deaths from Alzheimer's disease
Deaths from dementia in California
Male actors from Massachusetts
Greek Orthodox Christians from the United States
Greek Orthodox Christians from Lebanon
American male voice actors
Actors from Lowell, Massachusetts
People from Calabasas, California
Military personnel from California
Los Angeles City College alumni
Burials at Forest Lawn Memorial Park (Hollywood Hills)
Lebanese emigrants to the United States
Middle Eastern Christians
Male Western (genre) film actors
United States Army soldiers
United States Army personnel of World War II
Western (genre) television actors